Mountain Soul is the eleventh album of original recordings by Patty Loveless. The album was recorded between January and March 2001 and was released on June 26 in the United States. It first charted on the Billboard Top Country Albums chart on July 14 (peaking on July 28 at #19), and remaining on the charts for 87 weeks until March 8, 2003. Other country superstars also have done "You'll Never Leave Harlan Alive" such as Kathy Mattea and Brad Paisley. A follow up album, Mountain Soul II was released in September 2009.

The album also charted on the main Top Billboard 200 chart, Top Bluegrass Album chart and the Top Internet Albums chart.

Rhapsody ranked the album #9 on its "Country’s Best Albums of the Decade" list.
 
Country Universe, ranked the album #10.

Engine 145 country music blog list it #6 on the "Top Country Albums of the Decade" list.

Track listing 
 "The Boys Are Back in Town" (Don Humphries, Pat Enright, Stuart Duncan) – 2:34
 "The Richest Fool Alive" (Kostas, Bobby Boyd, Don Mealer) – 3:22
 "Daniel Prayed" (Ralph Stanley) – 2:45
 "Someone I Used to Know" (Jack Clement) – 2:17
 duet with Jon Randall
 "Out of Control Raging Fire" (Kostas, Melba Montgomery) – 3:33
 duet with Travis Tritt
 "Rise Up Lazarus" (Emory Gordy Jr., Patty Loveless) – 2:21
 "Cheap Whiskey" (Jim Rushing, Gordy Jr.) – 3:42
 "Pretty Little Miss" (Gordy Jr., Loveless) – 2:41
 "I Know You're Married (But I Love You Still)" (Don Reno, Mack Magaha) – 2:54
 duet with Travis Tritt
 "Sorrowful Angels" (Leslie Satcher, Tommy Conners) – 3:58
 "Soul of Constant Sorrow" (Gordy Jr., Loveless) – 3:04
 "You'll Never Leave Harlan Alive" (Darrell Scott) – 6:06
 "Two Coats" (arr. Gordy Jr., Loveless) – 3:18
 "Sounds of Loneliness" (Loveless) – 3:48

Personnel 

 Patty Loveless - lead vocals
 Emory Gordy, Jr. - guitar, bass, slack key guitar
 Clarence "Tater" Tate - bass, fiddle, bass vocal
 Tim Hensley - mandolin, backing vocals
 Stuart Duncan - mandolin, fiddle, backing vocals
 Deanie Richardson - fiddle
 Rob Ickes - dobro
 Alan O'Bryant - banjo
 Carmella Ramsey - drone fiddle, backing vocals
 Gene Wooten - dobro
 Butch Lee - banjo, bass, mandolin

 Ricky Skaggs - mandolin, backing vocals
 Jon Randall - guitar, mandolin backing vocals
 Earl Scruggs - banjo
 Travis Tritt - duet vocal, lead/rhythm guitar, backing vocals
 Biff Watson - guitar
 Steve Gibson - mandola
 Rebecca Lynn Howard - backing vocals
 Jeff White - guitar
 Darrell Scott - dobro, banjo
 Jeff White - backing vocals
 Tom Britt - slide guitar

Charts

Weekly charts

Year-end charts

References 

2001 albums
Epic Records albums
Patty Loveless albums
Albums produced by Emory Gordy Jr.
Bluegrass albums